Doğrugöz (formerly Eğrigöz) is a town in Konya Province, Turkey.

Geography 

It is situated between a mountain range and a partially dried up lake. The population is 4066  as of 2011.

History 
The vicinity of the town was probably inhabited during the Roman Empire era. Beginning by the Turkish domination in the 12th century, a han (a type of caravanserai) was built in the present location of the town. First inhabitant of the town was a certain Ali Baba who was responsible in running the han. Soon a village was established. The earliest names of the village were Eğriöz and Eğrigöz. After the event of Cimri (attempted coup) in 1277 the population of the village increased by the newcomers. 

The village was declared township in 1959 and the town was renamed as Doğrugöz in 1980.

Economy 
Most of the town's agricultural area is composed of fruit orchards. The most important crops are cherries and sour cherries.

References 

Populated places in Konya Province
Towns in Turkey
Akşehir District